Norristhorpe is a village in the township of Liversedge in Kirklees, West Yorkshire, England, and is historically part of the West Riding of Yorkshire.

Norristhorpe has a primary school, an Anglican church, and a United Reformed Church. A Methodist chapel, built in 1906, was closed in 2004 and is now a private house.

References

Villages in West Yorkshire
Geography of Kirklees